The Battle of Beroe was a conflict near Stara Zagora, ancient Ulpia Augusta Traiana, between the Romans and Goths in 250 AD which resulted in a Gothic victory.

References

Beroe
Beroe
Beroe
Beroe
Military history of Bulgaria
History of Stara Zagora Province
Beroe